Priya Sharma (born 30 December 1971) is a British fantasy and horror short-story writer and novelist.

Her short story Fabulous Beasts won the 2016 British Fantasy Award for Best Short Fiction, her debut collection All the Fabulous Beasts won the 2018 Shirley Jackson Award and the 2019 British Fantasy Award for Best Collection, and her debut novella Ormeshadow won the 2019 Shirley Jackson Award and the 2020 British Fantasy Award for Best Novella.

Personal life 
Sharma was born and grew up in the North-West of England.  She gained a Bachelor of Medicine, Bachelor of Surgery at medical school and works full-time as a general practitioner on the Wirral.

Works

Novella 
 Ormeshadow, 2019, Tor Books:

Collections 
  All the Fabulous Beasts, 2018, Undertow Publications:

Stories 
 In the Garden, 2005
 Sweetpea, 2005
 Screaming Purple Psychosis, 2006
 The Englishman, 2006
 The Lady, Eve, 2007
 The Last Man in Africa, 2009
 The Indifferent Stars, 2009
 The Soul of Stones, 2009
 The Nature of Bees, 2010
 The Bitterness of Apples, 2010
 The Show, 2011
 The Virgin's Tears, 2011
 Lebkuchen, 2011
 The Fox Maiden, 2011
 The Orchid Hunters, 2011
 Fish Skins, 2012
 Pearls, 2012
 The Ballad of Boomtown, 2012
 Needlepoint, 2012
 Lady Dragon and the Netsuke Carver, 2012
 Rag and Bone, 2013, tor.com
 Thesea and Astaurius, 2013
 After Mary, 2013
 Egg, 2013
 The Sunflower Seed Man, 2013
 The Anatomist's Mnemonic, 2013
 The Rising Tide, 2014
 The Firebrand, 2014
 The Absent Shade, 2015
 The Red Vortex, 2015
 Fabulous Beasts, 2015, tor.com
 Blonde, 2015
 Grave Goods, 2016
 Inheritance, or The Ruby Tear, 2016
 The Crow Palace, 2017
 Mercury, 2017
 A Son of the Sea, 2018
 Small Town Stories, 2018
 Maw, 2018

References

External links 
 Priya Sharma Fiction author blog
 
 Priya Sharma at tor.com

1971 births
British fantasy writers
British horror writers
21st-century British novelists
21st-century British women writers
Living people